Cotendo, Inc. is a content delivery network
and an application delivery network
service provider. The company's headquarters is in Sunnyvale, California, with research and development based in Netanya, Israel. In March 2012, Akamai acquired Cotendo for over US$250 million.

Timeline 

Cotendo was founded in January 2008 with funding from Sequoia Capital.

On March 10, 2009, Cotendo launched their CDN service and announced a US$7 million second round of funding from Sequoia Capital and Benchmark Capital.

On March 6, 2012, Akamai acquired Cotendo for over US$250 million.

See also 
 Peer-to-peer
 Content delivery network
 Application delivery network

References

External links 
Cotendo Home Page

Telecommunications companies established in 2008
Companies based in Sunnyvale, California
Online companies of the United States
2008 establishments in California